Árpád Balázs (born 1 October 1937 in Szentes, Hungary) is a classical music composer. He studied composition in Budapest and Rome, and presented a series about classical music on Hungarian television.

His compositions have been recommended for students learning to play the piano, and in the UK his piece "Trudging" is one of the set performance pieces for the 2009-2010 ABRSM Grade 1 Piano examination.

References

1937 births
Living people
People from Szentes
Hungarian composers
Hungarian male composers
Members of the European Academy of Sciences and Arts